Richmond County Courthouse is a historic courthouse building located at Warsaw, Richmond County, Virginia. It was built between 1748 and 1750, and is a one-story Colonial era brick building with a hipped roof. It measures approximately 52 feet by 41 feet. During a remodeling in 1877, the original arcade was bricked up and incorporated into the main building. Also on the property is a contemporary clerk's office. The buildings were built by planter Landon Carter (1710–1778).

It was added to the National Register of Historic Places in 1972.

References

External links

 Richmond County Courthouse, U.S. Route 360, Warsaw, Richmond, VA: 2 photos at Historic American Buildings Survey

Historic American Buildings Survey in Virginia
Courthouses on the National Register of Historic Places in Virginia
County courthouses in Virginia
Government buildings completed in 1748
Colonial architecture in Virginia
Buildings and structures in Richmond County, Virginia
National Register of Historic Places in Richmond County, Virginia
1748 establishments in Virginia